San Pasqual High School is a public high school in Escondido, California. It is named after the nearby San Pasqual Valley. It is within the Escondido Union School District.

Athletics

Teams
The school supports numerous sports teams that are accredited by the CIF (SDS Division) such as:

In 2010, the Eagles Boys' Varsity Soccer team had become California Interscholastic Federation Division 1 champions.

In 2012, the Eagles Boys' Varsity Soccer team had established a winning season in which they were nationally recognized as the 3rd ranked high school team in the United States and 1st ranked in California according to MaxPreps.com with a record of 20-2-1.

In 2018, the Eagles Girl's Varsity Wrestling Team became the San Diego Section CIF Champions, with 7 Section & 1 State Placers coached by Danny Harris.

In 2019, the Eagles Boys' Varsity basketball team had become CIF Division 5 champions, led by alum and coach Erik Meek.

Notable alumni

Athletics 

 Jovan Kirovski — Former soccer player, currently an assistant coach for Los Angeles Galaxy in Major League Soccer
 Erik Meek — Class of '91, Former National Basketball Association player
 Shannon MacMillan — Class of '93, Former professional soccer Player and Oregon Sports Hall of Fame inductee
 Nikki Serlenga — Former professional soccer Player

Arts and Media 

 Andrea Zittel — Class of '83, sculptor and installation artist

Business 

 Tom Anderson — Class of '88, creator of the social networking website Myspace

Statistics and demographics
As of the 2011–2012 school year, the enrollment was approximately 2500 students.

As of 2011, European American students comprise 43% of the population, Hispanic and Latino American students comprise 47%, Asian American students comprise 6%, African American students comprise 3%, and American Indian students comprise 1%.

Notes

External links
 http://sphsgoldeneagles.org/
 https://www.flickr.com/groups/sanpasqualhighschool/

High schools in San Diego County, California
Public high schools in California
Education in Escondido, California